Qaleh Hammam (also Romanized as Qal‘eh Ḩammām) is a village in Qaleh Hamam Rural District, Salehabad County, Razavi Khorasan Province, Iran. At the 2006 census, its population was 86, in 19 families.

References 

Populated places in   Torbat-e Jam County